Tamaryn Payne (born 25 September 1988), is an English actress best known for playing Annalise Appleton in the series Hollyoaks.

Early life
Payne was raised in Bournemouth, attending the grammar school Bournemouth School for Girls. She then studied for a BTEC at Bournemouth and Poole College before studying for a BA degree in acting at the Arts Educational Schools, London, graduating in 2010.

Career
In 2010, Payne appeared in the short film I Luv Matt Johnson playing Zoe.

In 2011, she played Emmie in the short film Atmospheric and, on 28 September, she joined the main cast of the British soap Hollyoaks as Annalise Appleton until February 2013 when her character decided to move to London after taking a job there.

In 2012, she appeared in the thriller Stalled where she played a character who gave birth to Evie.

In 2017, she played Widow Ordlaf in series 4, episode 20, of Vikings who was consoled for the loss of her husband by Bishop Heahmund.

Filmography

References

External links 
 
 Tamaryn Payne, Digital Spy

English soap opera actresses
1988 births
Living people
English television actresses
21st-century English actresses
English stage actresses
People from Slough
People educated at the Arts Educational Schools